The 1934 Walker Cup, the 8th Walker Cup Match, was played on 11 and 12 May 1934, on the Old Course at St Andrews, Scotland. The United States won by 9 matches to 2 with one match halved. The United States won three foursomes matches and six of the singles matches.

Format
Four 36-hole matches of foursomes were played on Friday and eight singles matches on Saturday. Each of the 12 matches was worth one point in the larger team competition. If a match was all square after the 36th hole extra holes were not played. The team with most points won the competition. If the two teams were tied, the previous winner would retain the trophy.

Teams
The United States picked a 9-man team in early January, including Francis Ouimet as playing-captain. Great Britain and Ireland announced 8 of their 10-man team in mid-March with Michael Scott as playing-captain. Eric McRuvie and Lionel Munn were later added. Munn, from Northern Ireland, travelled to St Andrews but suffered from sciatica, withdrawing two days before the match. He was replaced by Leonard Crawley.

Great Britain & Ireland
 & 
Playing captain:  Michael Scott
 Harry Bentley
 Leonard Crawley
 Eric Fiddian
 Sam McKinlay
 Jack McLean
 Eric McRuvie
 Cyril Tolley
 Tony Torrance
 Roger Wethered

United States

Playing captain: Francis Ouimet
George Dunlap
Chandler Egan
Johnny Fischer
Johnny Goodman
Lawson Little
Max Marston
Gus Moreland
Jack Westland

Friday's foursomes

Saturday's singles

References

Walker Cup
Golf tournaments in Scotland
Walker Cup
Walker Cup
Walker Cup